Jessica Rich may refer to:

 Jessica Rich (designer) (born 1984), American fashion designer
 Jessica Rich (snowboarder) (born 1990), Australian snowboarder